Loilem District is a district of the Shan State in Myanmar. It consists of 9 towns in 2010.
Its capital is Loilem.

Townships

The district contains the following townships:

Loilem Township
Nansang Township
Kunhing Township
Lai-Hka Township
Kyethi Township
Mong Kung Township
Mong Hsu Township

Mong Pan Township was moved under Langkho District.

References 

 
Districts of Myanmar
Geography of Shan State